"At Home" is the fifth single by English electronic music band Crystal Fighters from their debut studio album, Star of Love. The single was released on 14 March 2011, by Zirkulo Records, to generally positive reviews.

Release
The single was widely played as part of the BBC Radio 1 playlist and was Dev's "Record of the Week" for 21 February.

Music video
The music video was directed by Ferry Gouw and shot by Adam Etherington.

Track listing

Reception
The single gained mainly positive reviews from the music industry, with Jasmine Phull of ThisIsFakeDIY awarding the album 8/10 and said this of the mix of traditional Basque music and electronica: "The quintet manages to bring two normally opposing genres together with an outcome not unlike one harmonious civil ceremony; the unity of two separate entities that work best when together". Major music magazines Q and Mojo both awarded the single 4 out of 5. Nick Bryans, of The Whiteboard Project, awarded the album 6.5 out of 10, citing the following:

Charts

References

2011 singles
Crystal Fighters songs
2010 songs